United Nations Security Council Resolution 304 was adopted unanimously on December 8, 1971. After examining the application of  the United Arab Emirates for membership in the United Nations, the Council recommended to the General Assembly that the United Arab Emirates be admitted.

See also
 List of United Nations Security Council Resolutions 301 to 400 (1971–1976)

References
Text of the Resolution at undocs.org

External links
 

 0304
 0304
 0304
1971 in the United Arab Emirates
December 1971 events